Something with Numbers is a rock band based in Australia. The band was formed on the New South Wales Central Coast, in Australia, in 2001. They have released an EP and four studio albums in their 7-year career. Something with Numbers found success in 2006, with the release of "Apple of the Eye (Lay Me Down)", which peaked at No. 34 on the ARIA Singles Chart, and placed No. 64 on the Triple J Hottest 100, 2006.

History

2001–2005: Early history and first releases
Something with Numbers formed in 2001, coming out of the Central Coast punk scene in New South Wales. The name of the band derived from a friend's suggestion that the band's name should be "something with numbers" (meant in the vein of blink-182 or Sum 41). 
The band soon signed to small indie label, Below Par Records, and worked towards releasing their first EP, The Barnicles & Stripes, in 2002. Two years later, in 2004, Something with Numbers released their debut album, Etiquette.

2006–2007: Perfect Distraction
The band continued to grow their sound and in 2006 they made their commercial breakthrough, with the release of their second studio album Perfect Distraction in October of that year. Their Goodbye Mickey Finn tour saw them play around the country with up-and-coming bands The Inches and The Lazys. The album featured a range of styles and genres, touching on soul rock and their usual punk rock sound. It featured three singles. "Apple of the Eye (Lay Me Down)" peaked at No. 34 on the ARIA Singles Chart, and placed No. 64 on the Triple J Hottest 100, 2006. The second single from the album was "Chase the Chaser", which failed to reach the ARIA Singles Chart; however, it did receive airplay on Australian music network, Channel V. Something with Numbers played at the Sydney Big Day Out on 25 January 2007. Channel V described the show as having the "best mosh of the day". Other notable concert appearances for the band have been alongside Lagwagon, Good Charlotte, Millencolin, The Ataris, Amber Calling and Panic! at the Disco.

2008–2010: Engineering the Soul
The band released their third album, Engineering the Soul, on 6 September 2008. They have returned from recording the album over nine weeks in March/April, at Mission Sound Studios, Brooklyn, New York, in the United States. The album was produced by Tim O'Heir. The first single off the new album was "Stay With Me Bright Eyes", which reached No. 48 in the Triple J Hottest 100, 2008. A music video was created for it. A second music video is planned, with the band advertising the filming to get extras for the video.

On 14 September 2008, Engineering the Soul debuted at number 20 on the ARIA Albums Chart.

2011–present: Maniac + 2011
In February 2011, Something with Numbers released news that they were writing for their fourth record. In a post on their Facebook page the band mentioned that fans should expect some new material in the later half of the year, and in addition to this, the band will most likely be going on tour to accompany the release.

In an interview with rock journalist Nick Milligan in August 2011, Grigg said of their fourth record: "I really want to make a heavy, catchy album. I don't particularly listen to heavy music anymore, but I enjoy playing it live. I want to write some energetic, heavy music that you can sing along to."

Something with Numbers performed at the Coaster festival in September 2011.

Members
 Jake Grigg
 Tim Crocker 
 Scott Chapman 
 Trent Crawford
 Lachlan West

Previous Members 
 Dave McBeath
 Lachlan Scott

Discography

Studio albums

EPs

Singles

Awards and nominations

ARIA Music Awards
The ARIA Music Awards is an annual awards ceremony that recognises excellence, innovation, and achievement across all genres of Australian music. They commenced in 1987.

! 
|-
| 2007
| "Apple of the Eye (Lay Me Down)"
| ARIA Award for Breakthrough Artist - Single
| 
| 
|-

References

Australian indie rock groups
Australian punk rock groups
New South Wales musical groups
Musical groups established in 2001